is a national highway of Japan that connects the capital cities of Miyagi Prefecture and Yamagata Prefecture, Sendai and Yamagata.

Route description

National Route 48 is one of the primary east-west highways in the prefectures of Miyagi and Yamagata and is the main toll-free route between the city of Sendai on the Pacific coast and the city of Yamagata in Yamagata Prefecture's interior plains. It carries traffic across the Ōu Mountains that separate the two cities. The highway's eastern terminus lies at a junction with National Route 45 in Sendai's Aoba ward. Its first stretch is a brief concurrency with National Route 286. Leaving National Route 286 and central Sendai, a  section of the highway, the Sendai Nishi Road, is a limited-access road that connects central Sendai to the cross-country Tōhoku Expressway via  of tunnels. Continuing west from the highway's junction with the Tōhoku Expressway, the highway is known as the Ayashi Bypass. The highway meets National Route 457, which is shares a brief concurrency with before that route continues to the south. Crossing into Yamagata Prefecture the highway shares a significant concurrency with National Route 13 in the Yamagata cities of Tendō and Yamagata. The highway while running concurrently with National Route 13, meets its western terminus at a junction with National Route 112 to the south of central Yamagata.

History
National Route 48 was first established as Secondary National Route 110 in 1953 between the cities of Sendai and Yamagata. It was upgraded to National Route 48 in 1963 and National Route 110 was abolished. The Sendai Nishi Road, billed as the "Land Gateway to Sendai", that links central Sendai to Sendai-Miyagi Interchange on the Tōhoku Expressway was partially opened in 1983 and fully opened in 1987 after construction was completed on a series of tunnels. It replaced the original, congested two-lane section of National Route 48 along the Hirose River. The road along the river was redesignated as Miyagi Prefecture Route 31 after the completion of the Sendai Nishi Road. The Ayashi Bypass to the west of the Sendai Nishi Road along the route was opened in 1994.

Major intersections
All junctions listed are at-grade intersections unless noted otherwise.

Japan National Route 110
 
 is a former secondary national highway of Japan that occupied the same route as National Route 48 from Sendai to Yamagata. It existed from 1953 to 1963, when it was redefined as the National Route 48.

References

External links

048
Roads in Miyagi Prefecture
Roads in Yamagata Prefecture